Lake Carlos State Park is a state park about 10 miles north of Alexandria, Minnesota, USA. The park was established in 1937 to provide a public recreational facility in one of Minnesota's summer resort centers, and attracts tourists from Minnesota and bordering states.

Visitors often view fauna such as beaver, deer, loons, grebes, various ducks and herons.

Five buildings in the park, constructed by the Works Progress Administration in the Rustic Style, are included within the National Register of Historic Places. These include the Mess Hall and Crafts Building within the group camp area, as well as the water tower, sanitation building, and bath house within the public use area.

The namesake lake, Lake Carlos, was named for the friend of an early settler.

References

 Rustic Style Resources in Minnesota State Parks: Lake Carlos State Park

External links

Lake Carlos State Park

1937 establishments in Minnesota
Historic districts on the National Register of Historic Places in Minnesota
Park buildings and structures on the National Register of Historic Places in Minnesota
Protected areas established in 1937
Protected areas of Douglas County, Minnesota
Rustic architecture in Minnesota
State parks of Minnesota
Works Progress Administration in Minnesota
National Register of Historic Places in Douglas County, Minnesota